Keith Evans (born March 22, 1969) is a former professional tennis player from the United States.

Evans had a highest ATP singles ranking of 195 in the world. He had victories over world Patrick Rafter, Alberto Mancini, Greg Rusedski, and a win over Bob/Mike Bryan in doubles.

Evans now runs a tennis academy, the KE Tennis Academy, in the USA.

References

External links
 
 KE Tennis Academy

American male tennis players
1969 births
Living people
Tennis people from Tennessee
Sportspeople from Memphis, Tennessee